William Robert 'Bertie' Crewe (1860 – 10 January 1937) was one of the leading English theatre architects in the boom of 1885 to 1915.

Biography
Born in Essex and partly trained by Frank Matcham, Crewe and his contemporaries W.G.R. Sprague and Thomas Verity, were together responsible for the majority – certainly more than 200 – of the theatres and variety palaces of the great building boom which took place in Britain between 1885 and 1915, peaking at the turn of the century. Crewe became known as one of the most dynamic architects of the 1890s-1900s, specialising entirely in theatres and later cinemas. He also designed the Paris Alhambra for Thomas Barrasford, which opened in 1904.

Crewe trained in Paris and London, where, as a young man, he was a frequent visitor to Frank Matcham's home. Up to the mid-1890s, Crewe collaborated with Sprague, producing the Lincoln Theatre Royal as well as a number of theatres around London. It was after he branched out on his own that he developed what was to become his characteristic Baroque-influenced style. His work around the turn of the century was marked by horizontal balconies tied to ranges of stage boxes and elaborate ornamental features. Cecil Masey trained in Crewe's office, working on large theatres and music halls that Crewe designed before the First World War. Masey's designs include the theatre at Stanford Hall, Nottinghamshire. In the early 1930s Masey worked for Sidney Bernstein on the creation of the Granada cinema circuit, including the Tooting Granada.

Crewe's last project, jointly with Henry G. Kay was the Regal, Kennington Road (opened 17 November 1937) by the Arthur O'Connor circuit. Designed as split theatre-cinema, the Edwardian Kennington Empire would have been in decline by the time of building.

After death
After World War II, many theatres that were not destroyed by bombing were in the way of redevelopment. The building boom of 1885 to 1915 was matched between 1950 and 1975 by theatre demolition. In that 25-year period, 35 theatres were demolished in Greater London alone.

Crewe's reputation has been re-established over the last 20 years. In 2004, the Palace Theatre, Redditch, (built 1913) completed a £3.7 million facelift. A now rare example of Edwardian theatre, it was successful in bidding for a Heritage Lottery Fund grant. Experts believe the Grade II-listed theatre is one of only six examples that can be fully attributed to Bertie Crewe.

Theatres

References

Notes

External links
 Corporation of London page on Bertie Crewe
 Theatre Trust dBase
 London Theatreland History
 Article on conversion of the Regal, Kennington Crewe's last project
 Theatre Architects and details of their Theatres
Bertie Crewe, architect: architectural drawings of theatres are held by the Victoria and Albert Museum Theatre and Performance Department.

People from Essex
English theatre architects
1937 deaths
Place of birth missing
Year of birth uncertain
1860 births